Eugenio "Eñing" Hofileña López Sr. (July 20, 1901 – July 5, 1975) was a leading business figure in the Philippines. He was founder of the López Group of Companies. He belonged to the prominent López family of Iloilo, one of the leading political families in the Philippines.

Personal life
López was born on July 20, 1901, in Jaro, Iloilo City. His parents were Benito Villanueva López, a former governor of Iloilo, and Presentación Javelona Hofileña. He was the older brother and only sibling of former Philippine Vice President Fernando López. He received his education at the Ateneo de Manila where he graduated in 1919, and later the original campus of the University of the Philippines in Manila, where he took up law and graduated in 1923. He earned his master of laws degree from Harvard University.

He was the first president, or "charter president", of the Rotary Club of Iloilo, the third oldest Rotary Club in the Philippines.

Career
López began as a provincial bus operator, and eventually became chairman of the Philippine's largest media conglomerate (ABS-CBN Corporation) and president of the Manila Electric Company (Meralco). In 1972 he accepted a Distinguished Service Award from the Harvard Business School, but several months later was compelled by President Ferdinand Marcos to sign over his shares in Meralco, was stripped of his holdings and forced into exile.

Death
His eldest child and heir apparent, Eugenio López Jr., or Geny, was jailed on charges of conspiring to assassinate Ferdinand Marcos. This was carried out by Marcos in order for Don Eñing, who was at that time was in exile in United States to sell his businesses to him, his family and relatives and to his cronies. At one time, Marcos would send the then-Philippine Ambassador to the US, Benjamin Romualdez, a brother of then-First Lady Imelda Marcos, to San Francisco, California, where the elder López was living along with his daughter, Precy and her Greek husband Steve Psinakis, to convince him to relinquish ownership of his businesses in his home country in order for it to sell to his entourage with a promise that his eldest child, Geny, would be released from jail. Don Eñing agreed, but his firstborn would remain in detention. As a result, he was double-crossed by the Marcos regime and his businesses were then completely in their hands. He was later diagnosed with cancer and died on July 5, 1975.

In popular culture
López was portrayed by Armando Goyena in the 1995 film Eskapo.

See also
Eugenio López Jr.
Eugenio López III
Fernando López

References

Further reading

1901 births
1975 deaths
ABS-CBN executives
Ateneo de Manila University alumni
Filipino chairpersons of corporations
Harvard University alumni
Eugenio Sr.
People from Iloilo City
Filipino television company founders
University of the Philippines Manila alumni
Visayan people
Deaths from cancer in California